Zebulon H. Baird House is a historic home located near Weaverville, Buncombe County, North Carolina. It was built about 1865, and is a two-story, "T"-plan Late Victorian style frame dwelling. It features elaborate detailing in its scrollwork and ornate chimneys with elaborate corbelling. In 2005, it was moved 100 yards to the south from its original location.

It was listed on the National Register of Historic Places in 2009.

References

Houses on the National Register of Historic Places in North Carolina
Victorian architecture in North Carolina
Houses completed in 1878
Houses in Buncombe County, North Carolina
National Register of Historic Places in Buncombe County, North Carolina